Acrossocheilus clivosius is a species of ray-finned fish in the genus Acrossocheilus from southern China and northern Vietnam.

References

Clivosus
Fish described in 1935
Freshwater fish of China
Fish of Vietnam